A number of productions for Wicked, a musical with music and lyrics by Stephen Schwartz and a book by Winnie Holzman, have won and nominated several awards. Wicked is based on the 1995 Gregory Maguire novel Wicked: The Life and Times of the Wicked Witch of the West (1995), a parallel novel of the 1939 film The Wizard of Oz and L. Frank Baum's classic story The Wonderful Wizard of Oz (1900).

Although the production received mixed reviews and was initially panned by The New York Times, it has proved to be a favorite among patrons. The Broadway production's success spawned productions in Chicago, Los Angeles, London's West End and San Francisco, as well as international productions in Japan, Germany, Australia and elsewhere, and two North American tours that have visited over thirty cities in Canada and the United States. The show celebrated its tenth anniversary on October 30, 2013 and is currently the 11th longest-running Broadway show in history, having played 4,430 performances as of June 22, 2014. Wicked has broken box office records around the world, holding weekly-gross-takings records in New York, Los Angeles, Chicago, St. Louis, and London, and obtaining the record for biggest opening in the West End (£100,000 in the first hour on sale). In the week ending January 2, 2011, the London, Broadway, and both national touring productions all broke the record for the highest weekly gross. Both the West End production and the North American tour have been seen by over two million patrons. The original show was nominated for ten Tony Awards in 2004, winning three, including the Best Actress in a Musical for Idina Menzel. It also won six Drama Desk Awards and one Grammy Award while the London show has been the recipient of five Laurence Olivier Award nominations, winning one.

Awards and nominations

Original Broadway production 
Since its opening on October 30, 2003, the original Broadway production of Wicked has been consecutively nominated every year for at least one award. Accruing 64 nominations in 8 years, this production has won 33 of them. Amongst these 63 nominations include 10 Tony Awards (including the Tony Award for Best Musical), a Grammy Award for Best Musical Theater Album, 11 Drama Desk Awards, and 10 Outer Critics Circle Awards.

North American tours 
The North American tours have been nominated 15 times for various awards, winning 13 of them.

Chicago production 
The Chicago production of Wicked received 5 Joseph Jefferson Award nominations in 2006.

London production 
Like the original Broadway production, the London production of Wicked has been consecutively nominated each year since its opening in 2006. This production has garnered a total of 25 nominations, winning 13 of them. The production has been nominated 5 times for a Laurence Olivier Award and eventually won one in 2010. In addition, the production regularly appears on audience choice award ceremonies.

Melbourne production 
The production of Wicked in Melbourne has garnered 24 nominations, winning 10 of them.

Brazilian production 
The production of Wicked in Brazil has garnered 40 nominations, winning 17 of them.

References 

Wicked
Awards